Goshing Gewog (Dzongkha: སྒོ་ཤིང་) is a gewog (village block) of Zhemgang District, Bhutan. Goshing Gewog is also a part of Panbang Dungkhag (sub-district), along with Bjoka, Ngangla, and Phangkhar Gewogs.

References 

Gewogs of Bhutan
Zhemgang District